The  is a two-lane national expressway in Aomori Prefecture, Japan. The expressway connects Noheji to the municipalities of Rokkasho, and Yokohama. It is owned and operated by Ministry of Land, Infrastructure, Transport and Tourism (MLIT), and is signed as an auxiliary route of National Route 279, but has no expressway number under their "2016 Proposal for Realization of Expressway Numbering."

Route description

The southern terminus of the Shimokita Expressway is at a signaled intersection with National Route 4 in Tōhoku. From here, the expressway immediately loops from a western heading to the northeastern one. Along the short loop it crosses into Noheji, back into Tōhoku, then into Noheji once more after crossing over National Route 4. The expressway then crosses over the Aoimori Railway Line and proceeds north.
From Noheji heading north through the Shimokita Peninsula, the expressway parallels the mainline of National Route 279. After a couple of interchanges, the expressway enters the village, Rokkasho. The expressway's importance in the village is critical due to the presence of multiple nuclear facilities.
The expressway heads northeast while in Rokkasho. It crosses into the town of Yokohama where it meets its temporary northern terminus at the main line of National Route 279.
While the expressway primarily has only one lane traveling in each direction, short passing lanes are available near Noheji-kimyo, Noheji-kita, and Rokkasho interchanges.

History
Planning began of the route commenced on 16 December 16, 1994. On 26 November 2004, the first section of the expressway opened to traffic between Noheji-half and Noheji-kita Interchanges. On 2 December 2005 the expressway was extended south to the current southern terminus at Noheji Interchange. On 13 November 2012 the expressway was extended north from Noheji-kita to Rokkasho Interchange. On 15 November 2017, the expressway opened to traffic between Rokkasho Interchange and Fukkoshi Interchange. On 23 December 2019, the first section of the expressway in Mutsu opened.

Future
The government of Aomori Prefecture plans for the Shimokita Expressway to be extended from both its northern terminus at Fukkoshi Interchange and its southern terminus at Noheji Interchange. From Fukkoshi, the expressway is to be extended   to Mutsu Interchange in the city of Mutsu in the northern part of Aomori. As of January 2018, some of this section is under construction. From Noheji Interchange, the expressway will be extended to a junction with the Kamikita Expressway and Michinoku Toll Road. On 11 January 2019, the governor of Aomori Prefecture, Shingo Mimura requested the Liberal Democratic Party's help in providing funding for the section between Noheji and Shichinohe. MLIT announced later in 2019 that the section between Noheji and Shichinohe will be evaluated to determine if the expressway should be extended.

Junction list
The entire expressway is in Aomori Prefecture.

See also

Japan National Route 279

References

External links

 Ministry of Land, Infrastructure and Transport: Tohoku Regional Development Bureau

Roads in Aomori Prefecture
Regional High-Standard Highways in Japan
Expressways in Japan
Proposed roads in Japan
2004 establishments in Japan